2017 South American Championships in Athletics was the 50th edition of the biennial athletics competition between South American nations. The event was held in Luque, near Asunción, Paraguay, from 23 to 25 June at the Pista Comité Olímpico Paraguayo. It was the first time this competition was held in that country.

Medal summary

Men

Women

Medal table

Points table

Participation
All 13 member federations of CONSUDATLE participated at the championships.

See also
2017 South American U20 Championships in Athletics
2017 Asian Athletics Championships
2017 World Championships in Athletics

References

External links

Official site
Full results

South American Championships in Athletics
International athletics competitions hosted by Paraguay
Sport in Asunción
South American Championships in Athletics
South American Championships in Athletics
Athletics Championships
June 2017 sports events in South America